The Swazi Charity Cup  or Swazi Telecom Charity Cup is the supercup tournament of the Swazi football.

Winners 
1992 : Denver Sundowns

Swazi Paper Mills Champion of Champions
1993 : Mbabane Swallows                   5-0 Manzini Wanderers

Charity Cup
1996 : Eleven Men in Flight
1998 : Mbabane Highlanders                2-0 Mbabane Swallows
1999 : Mbabane Swallows (played in league format)
2000 : Denver Sundowns

Baphalali Charity Cup
2001 : Nkomazi Sundowns                   2-0 Young Buffaloes FC

Swazi Telecom Charity Cup
2002 : Manzini Wanderers                  1-1 Royal Leopards          (aet, 5-3 pen.)
2003 : Manzini Wanderers                  2-0 Mbabane Swallows
2004 : Mbabane Swallows                  1-0 Mbabane Highlanders
2005 : Manzini Wanderers                  1-0 Mbabane Highlanders
2006 : Royal Leopards                        3-1 Mbabane Swallows
2007 : Mbabane Highlanders and Manzini Wanderers  (abandoned at 2-0 in 75')
2008 : Mbabane Highlanders              0-0 Mbabane Swallows        (aet, 5-4 pen.)
2009 : Moneni Pirates FC                  2-1 Mbabane Highlanders
2010 : Mbabane Highlanders            1-0 Manzini Wanderers
2011 : Manzini Sundowns                 2-1 Manzini Wanderers
2012 : Manzini Sundowns                 1-0 Young Buffaloes FC
2013 : Royal Leopards                      0-0 Young Buffaloes FC       (aet, 4-1 pen.)
2014 : Mbabane Swallows                0-0 Royal Leopards           (aet, 5-4 pen.)
2015 : Royal Leopards                     1-0 Mbabane Swallows
2016 : Royal Leopards                     2-0 Manzini Wanderers
2017: Mbabane Swallows                1-1 Royal Leopards          [5-4 pen]
2018: Mbabane Swallows                2-1 Mbabane Highlanders
2019:

External links
Swaziland - List of Cup Winners, RSSSF.com

Football competitions in Eswatini
National association football supercups